= 1963–64 Plunket Shield season =

Cricket tournament in New Zealand

1963–64 Plunket Shield
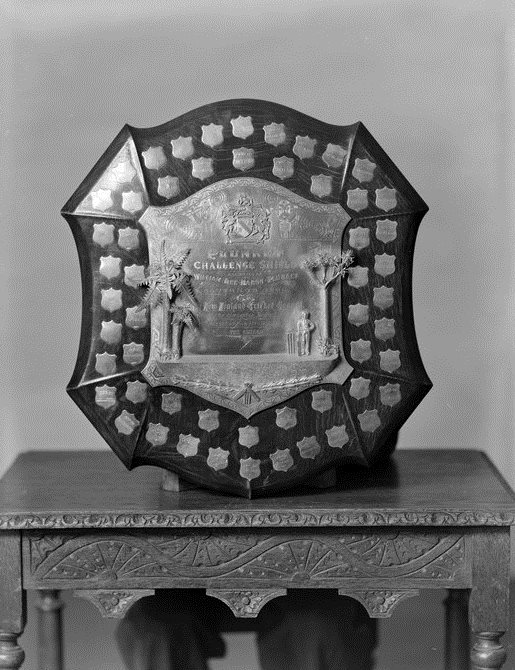
- The Plunket Shield trophy
- Cricket format: First-class
- Tournament format(s): Round-robin
- Champions: Auckland (11th title)
- Participants: 6
- Matches: 15

The 1963–64 Plunket Shield season was a tournament of the Plunket Shield, the domestic first-class cricket competition of New Zealand.

Auckland won the championship, finishing at the top of the points table at the end of the round-robin tournament between the six first-class sides, Auckland, Canterbury, Central Districts, Northern Districts, Otago and Wellington. Ten points were awarded for a win, five points for having a first innings lead in a draw, three points for having a first innings lead in a loss and one point for a first innings deficit in a draw.

== Table ==
Below are the Plunket Shield standings for the season:

Team	Played	Won	Lost	Drawn	Points	Net RpW
Auckland	5	4	0	1	41	4.912
Wellington	5	4	1	0	40	8.497
Central Districts	5	1	1	3	21	−2.136
Canterbury	5	1	2	2	19	−0.129
Northern Districts	5	0	2	3	10	−1.711
Otago	5	0	4	1	8	−9.616
